Fourth cabinet of Azerbaijan Democratic Republic governed Azerbaijan Democratic Republic (ADR) between 14 April 1919 and 22 December 1919. It was formed after the third cabinet of Azerbaijan Democratic Republic dissolved on March 14, 1919 and was led by Prime Minister of Azerbaijan Nasib Yusifbeyli with the following composition:

Among notable events during the government of the fourth coalition government are signing of the oil contracts with foreign oil companies and subsequent export of Azerbaijani oil, signing of Cooperation and Defense Pact with Democratic Republic of Georgia against the threat of Denikin forces from the north, etc.

See also
Cabinets of Azerbaijan Democratic Republic (1918-1920)
Current Cabinet of Azerbaijan Republic

References

Cabinets of Azerbaijan
Government ministers of Azerbaijan
Cabinets established in 1919
Cabinets disestablished in 1919
1919 establishments in Azerbaijan
1919 disestablishments in Azerbaijan